The SEC filing is a financial statement or other formal document submitted to the U.S. Securities and Exchange Commission (SEC). Public companies, certain insiders, and broker-dealers are required to make regular SEC filings. Investors and financial professionals rely on these filings for information about companies they are evaluating for investment purposes. Many, but not all SEC filings are available online through the SEC's EDGAR (Electronic Data Gathering, Analysis, and Retrieval) database.

Common filing types
The most commonly filed SEC forms are the 10-K and the 10-Q.  These forms are composed of four main sections: The business section, the F-pages, the Risk Factors, and the MD&A.  The business section provides an overview of the Company.  The F-pages contain the financial statements which are either audited or reviewed by an independent auditor.  

The Risk Factors contain a list of all of the potential risks that exist for the company.  While the MD&A contains a narrative about the financial results of the company.  This narrative is also accompanied by management's expectations for the upcoming year.

Other filings are required with respect to offerings by private companies.

All filing types
The filings accepted by the SEC as of November 2011.

See also
Form 10-K405

Form suffixes

Finding forms
All forms are filed with the SEC, and many can be found for free in the SEC's EDGAR database. There are also several other portals that specialize in sorting information found in individual forms, such as the financial search engine, AlphaSense.

Forms which are not found in EDGAR include the Form PF, which is used for private funds and is kept confidential per the Dodd–Frank Act.

References

External links
 A full listing of EDGAR form types
 Forms and filing instructions (including forms not included in EDGAR list)
 SEC website

Financial reporting